Jerzy Katlewicz (2 April 1927 Bochnia – 16 November 2015 Kraków) was a Polish music conductor, pianist and Professor of the Academy of Music in Kraków since 1990. Katlewicz graduated from the same Academy in 1952 (then called Państwowa Wyższa Szkoła Muzyczna in Kraków), and served as conductor of the Kraków Philharmonic between 1952 and 1958 during the period of Stalinism in Poland (and its aftermath). He was appointed artistic director there a decade later, in 1968 and remained at his post until 1981. In 1961-68 he was artistic director of Polish Baltic Opera and Philharmonic in Gdańsk. In 1984–1985 he was artistic director of the Symphony Orchestra and Choir of the Polish Radio and Television state agency in Kraków. Katlewicz was the recipient of the Commander's Cross with Star of the Order of Merit of the Republic of Poland (1993), among other distinctions.

Born in Bochnia, he died on 16 November 2015 in Kraków.

Awards
 1993 : Commander's Cross with Star of the Order of Merit of the Republic of Poland
 1993 : Decoration of Honour
 1999 : Order of St. Gregory the Great

Discography
 1976 Canticum Canticorum Salomonis / Strophes / Cantata (LP),  Polskie Nagrania Muza   
 1980 III Symfonia Pieśni Żałosnych Na Sopran I Orkiestrę Op. 36 (Symphony No. 3, The Symphony Of Sorrowful Songs For Soprano And Orchestra Op. 36), 3 versions;  Polskie Nagrania Muza   
 1980 III Symfonia Pieśni Żałosnych Na Sopran I Orkiestrę Op. 36 (Symphony No. 3, The Symphony Of Sorrowful Songs For Soprano And Orchestra Op. 36),  LP, Album;  Polskie Nagrania Muza    
 1993 III Symfonia - Symfonia Pieśni Żałosnych Na Sopran I Orkiestrę Op. 36  (Cass, Album, RE)  Polskie Nagrania Muza 1993 Symphony No. 3 / Symfonia Pieśni Żałosnych Na Sopran I Orkiestrę Op.36  (CD, Album, RE)  Polskie Nagrania Muza    
 1986  Mazurian Chronicles II / Musica Humana,  (LP)  Polskie Nagrania Muza   
  Symphony No.3, Three Pieces In The Olden Style - Amen For Choir''  (CD, Album)

Notes and references

Alumni of the Academy of Music in Kraków
Academic staff of the Academy of Music in Kraków
Polish conductors (music)
Male conductors (music)
People from Bochnia
1927 births
2015 deaths
Recipients of the Gold Medal for Merit to Culture – Gloria Artis
Commanders with Star of the Order of Merit of the Republic of Poland